Embarras, Alberta may refer to:

Embarras, Alberta, a locality in Yellowhead County, Alberta
Embarras, Wood Buffalo, Alberta, a locality in Wood Buffalo, Alberta